Mark David Bailey (born 1960) is a professor of later medieval history at the University of East Anglia. In 2019, he delivered the James Ford Lectures in British History at Oxford University, which were later published as a book, After the Black Death: Economy, society, and the law in fourteenth-century England. Bailey was formerly a rugby union player, and made seven appearances for the England national team.

Early life
Born 21 November 1960, Castleford, Yorkshire, Bailey was educated at Dale Hall Primary School, then Ipswich School, an independent school in the town of Ipswich in Suffolk, followed by Durham University, graduating with a Bachelor of Arts degree in economic history in 1982. He then completed his doctoral studies at Corpus Christi College, Cambridge; his PhD was awarded in 1987 for his thesis "At the margin: Suffolk Breckland in the Middle Ages".

Sporting career
He won the Cricket Society's Wetherell Award in 1979 for the best public school all-rounder and played for the NCA Young Cricketers in 1980. The same year he made his debut in the Minor Counties for Suffolk, for whom he played until 1991 and served as captain between 1988–90.

Bailey played rugby for Durham University and the University of Cambridge, captaining the latter in the 1983 and 1984 Varsity matches. He won four Blues at Cambridge. He later served as secretary of Cambridge University R.U.F.C. as its representative on the Rugby Football Union, and was president of the club. Bailey played on the wing for Bedford in 1981–2 and for London Wasps between 1984–90, winning the premiership in the 1989–90 season. Bailey was a captain of the England B national team. He also received international honours for England, and played seven times. He made his international in a 1984 series against South Africa, and later played for England at the 1987 Rugby World Cup, and in the 1990 Five Nations Championship. He also played for the Barbarians invitational side.

After retiring, Bailey became a member of the Rugby Football Union's playing committee. On 16 June 2003, Bailey was honoured with Durham University's Palatinate Award for Sport.

Academic career
Bailey was elected to a fellowship at Gonville and Caius College, Cambridge in 1986 and was appointed to lectureship in local history at the University of Cambridge in 1991. In 1996, he left both positions and became a fellow at Corpus Christi. In 1999 he was appointed Head of Leeds Grammar School.

In 2010 Bailey left Leeds to spend one term as a visiting fellow in medieval history at All Souls College, Oxford. He then took up the post of professor of later medieval history at the University of East Anglia that year. In 2011 he succeeded George Martin Stephen as high master of St Paul's School, London, a role he held until June 2020. His position was taken up by Sally-Anne Huang and he returned to the University of East Anglia as a professor.

Bailey was invited to deliver the Ford Lectures in British History at the University of Oxford in 2019, which were published in 2021 by Oxford University Press (After the Black Death: Economy, society, and the law in fourteenth-century England). He has written seven books and published a number of academic articles on the economy and society of medieval England.  In 2014 he published The Decline of Serfdom in late medieval England: from bondage to freedom.

Bibliography 

 A Marginal Economy?: East Anglian Breckland in the later Middle Ages (Cambridge University Press, 1989). 
 (Editor) The Bailiffs’ Minute Book of Dunwich 1404–1430 (Boydell Press, 1992). 
 (Co-authored with John Hatcher) Modelling the Middle Ages: The History and Theory of England’s Economic Development (Oxford University Press, 2001).
 The English Manor c. 1200–1500 (Manchester University Press, 2002).
 Medieval Suffolk: An Economic and Social History 1200–1500 (Boydell Press, 2007). 
 (Co-edited with Carole Rawcliffe, and Maureen Jurkowski) Poverty and Wealth: Sheep, Taxation and Charity in Medieval Norfolk (Norfolk Record Society, 2007).
 (Co-authored with S. H. Rigby) Town and Countryside in the Age of the Black Death: Essays in Honour of John Hatcher (Brepols, 2012).
 The Decline of Serfdom in Late Medieval England (Boydell Press, 2014).
 After the Black Death: Economy, society, and the law in fourteenth-century England (Oxford University Press, 2021)

References

1960 births
Living people
People educated at Ipswich School
Alumni of the College of St Hild and St Bede, Durham
Alumni of Corpus Christi College, Cambridge
English rugby union players
Rugby union wings
Bedford Blues players
Wasps RFC players
Cambridge University R.U.F.C. players
Durham University RFC players
England international rugby union players
Academics of the University of East Anglia
English cricketers
Suffolk cricketers
High Masters of St Paul's School
Suffolk cricket captains
British historians
Cricketers from Castleford
Rugby union players from Castleford
English cricketers of 1969 to 2000